Lists of Southern Hemisphere tropical cyclone seasons provides regional indexes to lists of articles about tropical cyclone seasons that occurred in the Southern Hemisphere.
They include:

South-West Indian Ocean tropical cyclone
 [[{{#ifexpr:>6|–|–}} South-West Indian Ocean cyclone season]]
Australian region tropical cyclone
 [[{{#ifexpr:>6|–|–}} Australian region cyclone season]]
South Pacific tropical cyclone
 [[{{#ifexpr:>6|–|–}} South Pacific cyclone season]]
South Atlantic tropical cyclone